Alamuru Mandal is one of the 22 mandals in Konaseema district of Andhra Pradesh. As per census 2011, there are 16 villages.

Demographics 
Alamuru Mandal has total population of 74,025 as per the Census 2011 out of which 36,955 are males while 37,070 are females and the Average Sex Ratio of Alamuru Mandal is 1,003. The total literacy rate of Alamuru Mandal is 65.77%. The male literacy rate is 60.29% and the female literacy rate is 57.89%.

Towns and villages

Villages 

Alamuru
Baduguvanilanka
Chintaluru
Choppela
Gummileru
Jonnada
Kalavacherla
Madiki
Modukuru
Narsipudi
Navabpeta
Pedapalle
Penikeru
Pinapalla
Sandhipudi
Mulastanam

See also 
List of mandals in Andhra Pradesh

References 

Mandals in Konaseema district
Mandals in Andhra Pradesh